Cryogenic electron microscopy (cryo-EM) is a cryomicroscopy technique applied on samples cooled to cryogenic temperatures. For biological specimens, the structure is preserved by embedding in an environment of vitreous ice. An aqueous sample solution is applied to a grid-mesh and plunge-frozen in liquid ethane or a mixture of liquid ethane and propane. While development of the technique began in the 1970s, recent advances in detector technology and software algorithms have allowed for the determination of biomolecular structures at near-atomic resolution. This has attracted wide attention to the approach as an alternative to X-ray crystallography or NMR spectroscopy for macromolecular structure determination without the need for crystallization.

In 2017, the Nobel Prize in Chemistry was awarded to Jacques Dubochet, Joachim Frank, and Richard Henderson "for developing cryo-electron microscopy for the high-resolution structure determination of biomolecules in solution." Nature Methods also named cryo-EM as the "Method of the Year" in 2015.

The Federal Institute of Technology, the University of Lausanne and the University of Geneva opened the Dubochet Center For Imaging (DCI) at the end of November 2021, for the purposes of applying and further developing cryo-EM. Less than a month after the first identification of the SARS-CoV-2 Omicron variant, researchers at the DCI were able to define its structure, identify the crucial mutations to circumvent individual vaccines and provide insights for new therapeutic approaches.

Transmission electron cryomicroscopy

Cryogenic transmission electron microscopy (cryo-TEM) is a transmission electron microscopy technique that is used in structural biology and materials science.

 Cryogenic electron tomography (Cryo-ET), a specialized application where samples are imaged as they are tilted
 Electron crystallography, method to determine the arrangement of atoms in solids using a TEM
 MicroED, method to determine the structure of proteins, peptides, organic molecules, and inorganic compounds using electron diffraction from 3D crystals
 Single particle analysis cryo-EM, an averaging method to determine protein structure from monodisperse samples

History

Early development 
In the 1960s, the use of transmission electron microscopy for structure determination methods was limited because of the radiation damage due to high energy electron beams.  Scientists hypothesized that examining specimens at low temperatures would reduce beam-induced radiation damage. Both liquid helium (−269 °C or 4 K or −452.2 °F) and liquid nitrogen (−195.79 °C or 77 K or −320 °F) were considered as cryogens. In 1980, Erwin Knapek and Jacques Dubochet published comments on beam damage at cryogenic temperatures sharing observations that:

Thin crystals mounted on carbon film were found to be from 30 to 300 times more beam-resistant at 4 K than at room temperature... Most of our results can be explained by assuming that cryoprotection in the region of 4 K is strongly dependent on the temperature.

However, these results were not reproducible and amendments were published in Nature just two years later informing that the beam resistance was less significant than initially anticipated. The protection gained at 4 K was closer to "tenfold for standard samples of L-valine", than what was previously stated.

In 1981, Alasdair McDowall and Jacques Dubochet, scientists at the European Molecular Biology Laboratory, reported the first successful implementation of cryo-EM. McDowall and Dubochet vitrified pure water in a thin film by spraying it onto a hydrophilic carbon film that was rapidly plunged into cryogen (liquid propane or liquid ethane cooled to 77 K).  The thin layer of amorphous ice was less than 1 µm thick and an electron diffraction pattern confirmed the presence of amorphous/vitreous ice.  In 1984, Dubochet's group demonstrated the power of cryo-EM in structural biology with analysis of vitrified adenovirus type 2, T4 bacteriophage, Semliki Forest virus, Bacteriophage CbK, and Vesicular-Stomatitis-Virus.

2017 Nobel Prize in Chemistry 
In recognition of the impact cryo-EM has had on biochemistry, three scientists, Jacques Dubochet, Joachim Frank and Richard Henderson, were awarded the Nobel Prize in Chemistry "for developing cryo-electron microscopy for the high-resolution structure determination of biomolecules in solution."

Potential rival to X-ray crystallography 

Traditionally, X-ray crystallography has been the most popular technique for determining the 3D structures of biological molecules. However, the aforementioned improvements in cryo-EM have increased its popularity as a tool for examining the details of biological molecules. As a comparison, X-ray crystallography has been used to determine the 3D structures of 169,077 biological molecules (as of September 30, 2022) while Cryo-EM has been used to determine fewer biological molecules at 12,647.

However, according to Nature, advancements in direct electron detectors (often referred to as a direct detection devices or DDDs) at the University of Cambridge and automation of sample production by SPT labtech has led to an increase in use in biological fields, making Cryo-EM a potential rival.

The resolution of X-ray crystallography is limited by crystal purity, and coaxing biological molecules into a crystalline state can be very time-consuming, taking up to months or even years. Although sample preparation for Cryo-EM is still laborious, it does not have these issues as it does not require the sample to be form a crystal, rather samples for cryo-EM are flash-frozen and examined in their near-native states.

According to Proteopedia, the median resolution achieved by X-ray crystallography (as of May 19, 2019) on the Protein Data Bank is 2.05 Å, and the highest resolution achieved on record (as of September 30, 2022) is 0.48 Å. As of 2020, the majority of the protein structures determined by Cryo-EM are at a lower resolution of 3–4 Å.  However, as of 2020, the best Cryo-EM resolution has been recorded at 1.22 Å, making it a competitor in resolution in some cases.

Correlative light Cryo-TEM and Cryo-ET 

In 2019, correlative light Cryo-TEM and Cryo-ET were used to observe tunnelling nanotubes (TNTs) in neuronal cells.

Scanning electron cryomicroscopy 

Scanning electron cryomicroscopy (cryoSEM) is a scanning electron microscopy technique with a scanning electron microscope's cold stage in a cryogenic chamber.

See also 
 Cryofixation
 Electron tomography (ET)

References 

Electron microscopy techniques
Cell biology
Protein structure
Scientific techniques